Russell Brooks Bailey (October 17, 1897 – September 15, 1949) was a professional American football center and surgeon. He played in the National Football League for the Akron Pros of the APFA (later renamed National Football League in 1922). He played college football at West Virginia University.

Career
Bailey attended Weston High School in Weston, West Virginia. He played college football at West Virginia from 1915 to 1919 where he studied a pre-med curriculum. At West Virginia, he was a two-time All-American in 1917 and 1919 and served as a team captain in 1917. Following his career at West Virginia, he graduated from the University of Cincinnati College of Medicine and earned his doctorate. 

He joined the Akron Pros in 1920 as the team's starting center,. The Pros would go undefeated and were awarded the Brunswick-Balke Collender Cup. He remained with the club through the 1921 season.

After football, Bailey worked as a surgeon in Wheeling, West Virginia, and served as chairman of the West Virginia Cancer Society, president of the West Virginia State Medical Association, chairman of the West Virginia Board of Health and director of the American Cancer Society. He died on September 15, 1949 after collapsing on a golf course in Wheeling.

Bailey was named to the West Virginia University Sports Hall of Fame in 1993.

References

External links
Pro-Football-Reference

1897 births
1949 deaths
People from Weston, West Virginia
University of Cincinnati College of Medicine alumni
Players of American football from West Virginia
American football centers
West Virginia Mountaineers football players
Akron Pros players
American surgeons